Jushin Rural District is in Kharvana District of Varzaqan County, East Azerbaijan province, Iran. At the National Census of 2006, its population was 4,308 in 1,026 households. There were 3,637 inhabitants in 984 households at the following census of 2011. At the most recent census of 2016, the population of the rural district was 4,454 in 1,449 households. The largest of its 15 villages was Seqay, with 722 people.

References 

Varzaqan County

Rural Districts of East Azerbaijan Province

Populated places in East Azerbaijan Province

Populated places in Varzaqan County